Two ships of the United States Navy have been named USS Sangamon:
 The first  was a monitor in the Civil War, later renamed Jason and in use for coastal defense during the Spanish–American War.
 The second  was a fleet oiler converted to an escort carrier during World War II.

United States Navy ship names